EBS Universität für Wirtschaft und Recht (literally "university for business and law"), more commonly referred to as EBS Universität or simply EBS, is a private, state-approved research university for business and law located in Wiesbaden and Oestrich-Winkel, founded in 1971. The university's activities focus on three core areas: undergraduate degree programs, postgraduate degree programs and executive education. The EBS Universität has the right to award doctorates and habilitations and is the oldest private university in Germany.

With the foundation of its law faculty in 2010, the former European Business School was awarded university status in 2011, forming the EBS Universität für Wirtschaft und Recht. Notable alumni are, e.g., former CEO of Puma (Jochen Zeitz), founder of Vapiano (Mark Korzilius), or former CEO of Deutsche Telekom AG (Kai-Uwe Ricke). Among the university's corporate partners, one can find McKinsey, Bertelsmann, Clifford Chance, Daimler AG, or UBS. Academic partnerships include UC Berkeley, Bocconi University, CEIBS, Sciences Po, National University of Singapore, and McGill University.

History 
EBS was founded in Offenbach am Main as a University of Applied Sciences by Klaus Evard in 1971. The young institution was named the European Business School. The original concept provided for a European-style leadership training program with three locations in France, England and Germany. To this day, the EBS study programme is characterised by several practical periods of study abroad, integrated semesters abroad and a school-based structure. In 1980 the School moved to Schloss Reichartshausen in Oestrich-Winkel in the Rheingau. In 1985 a second university building (the "Burg") was added in Oestrich-Winkel.

In 1989 it was awarded higher education status, 1992 it was finally recognised as a scientific university by the Hessian Minister of Science. This step was followed by the separation of EBS Schloss Reichartshausen from the international network of European Business Schools, which had developed into a network in the 1980s. Since then, EBS has been cooperating with independent universities worldwide. In 1993 it was awarded the right to confer doctoral degrees and in 1998 the right to confer post-doctoral (professorial) qualifications. On 16 June 2010, the EBS Law School was founded as a second faculty alongside the EBS Business School and "Universität in Gründung" (University under formation) status was gained. The EBS Law School is located in Wiesbaden and is the official seat of EBS the Universität. Since September 2011 the EBS Universität für Wirtschaft und Recht has the official status of a university.

In December 2018 the third EBS Executive School faculty was founded.

Campus 

The EBS maintains a total of three locations for teaching, research, and administrative purposes. The two largest campuses are located in Wiesbaden and Oestrich-Winkel. The newer Wiesbaden campus houses the EBS Law School, while Reichartshausen castle at the larger and older Oestrich-Winkel campus houses the EBS Business School.

Organization and administration 

Shareholders of the EBS Universität für Wirtschaft und Recht gGmbH are SRH Higher Education GmbH, a wholly owned subsidiary of the non-profit foundation SRH, and the alumni association EBS Alumni e.V.

President 2016-2020: Markus Ogorek

President 2021 - today: Günther H. Oettinger

Rector 2021 - today: Prof. Martin Boehm

Academic profile 

The EBS Universität offers degree programmes at the undergraduate and graduate levels. The EBS Business School offers traditional German business and economics (Betriebswirtschaftslehre) education as well as specialized MSc programmes in Management, Finance, and other areas. The EBS Law School offers degree courses leading to the German State Examination in jurisprudence. Both faculties also offer doctoral programmes and award habilitations.

A personal coach is available to all students and doctoral candidates to support them throughout their studies. The University also offers a range of executive education programmes for specialists and managers. EBS is a member of the academic section of the UN Global Compact, a global initiative to promote corporate citizenship.

In addition to business-related research, EBS has a chair of Philosophy of Science and an Institute for Business Ethics.

Advanced training

Since December 2018, the EBS Executive School has been offering part-time continuing education programs and certificate programs.

Student life

Students work together in numerous student initiatives to address social issues, organize events and congresses, or consult small and mid-sized businesses. One notable event is the annual EBS Symposium, which brings together renowned personalities of business and politics with students and journalists to discuss current business issues.

Accreditations 
 EQUIS: The EBS was accredited by EQUIS from 2012 to 2016. The EBS did not fulfill the criteria for the reaccreditation of EQUIS in 2015 as ruled by the EFMD, but was granted the right to go through the reaccreditation process once again in 2016. In December 2016, EBS lost its EQUIS accreditation by failing to satisfy the requirements of the EFMD.
 FIBAA: All programs are accredited by the Foundation for International Business Administration Accreditation (FIBAA)
 Since 2012 EBS holds the institutional accreditation by the German Council of Science and Humanities.
EBS University of Economics and Law is partner of Association to Advance Collegiate Schools of Business (AACSB)

Rankings 

According to the Financial Times, EBS was ranked sixth overall in Germany in 2016, after Mannheim, ESMT Berlin, WHU – Otto Beisheim School of Management and Handelshochschule Leipzig. Since 2017, it did not make any of the FT rankings.

Financial Times-Ranking
Master in Management
 2014: #4 in Germany and #14 worldwide; #1 worldwide in "Corporate Strategy" and "Organisational Behaviour" 
 2015: #2 in Germany and #11 worldwide 
CHE-Hochschulranking 
 Bachelor (Business School)
 2014/15: Ranked among the best in 5 of the 5 considered evaluated areas
2017: Top Tier  Law (Law School):
2017: Top Tier
 Master (Business School)
 2014/15: Ranked among the best in 5 of the 5 considered evaluated areas
2017: Top 6

Eduniversal Ranking

 2013:
Best Master in General Management in Western Europe: #14
Best Master in Real Estate worldwide: #14
2014/15: 
 Business School: #3 in Germany.
 Master in Management: #2 in Germany and #14 in Europe.
 Master in Real Estate Management: #1 in Germany and #2 worldwide
 Master in Financial Markets: #1 in Germany and 17 worldwide
 MBA Full-Time: #3 in Germany and #25 in Western Europe
 Exec. MBA Part-Time: #2 in Germany and #19 in Western Europe  2016:
3 in Germany: Universal business schools with major international influence
Best Master in Real Estate worldwide: #3
Best Master in Innovation and project Management in Western Europe: #11     
2017:
3 in Germany: TOP Business school with significant international influence
Best Master in Real Estate worldwide: #2
Best Master in General Management in Europe: #14
2018:
Best Master in Financial Markets worldwide: #21
Best Master in Financial Markets Germany: #1
Best Master in General Management in Europe: #13
Best Master in Real Estate worldwide: #2
Best EMBA in Europe: #27
Best MBA in Europe: #22
Best Master in Innovation and project Management in Europe: #7  
U-Multirank:
2014: Top Tier
2017: Top Tier

Presidents
 Klaus Evard
Walter Leisler Kiep
Hans Tietmeyer
 Christopher Jahns
 Rolf Cremer
 Rolf Wolff
Markus Ogorek
Günther H. Oettinger

Alumni

The alumni association

Founded in 1971, the EBS's Alumni Association is one of the oldest and largest networks of alumni in Germany, with over 3,400 members. In 2008 the EBS Alumni Association initiated the Alumni Alliance, a strategic cooperation between the Harvard Clubs of Germany, Stanford Alumni Rhein-Main Frankfurt, HSG Alumni St. Gallen Frankfurt, and ETH Alumni Zürich and Frankfurt.

List of notable alumni
 Cornelius Boersch, Business Angel
 Prince Maximilian of Liechtenstein, CEO LGT Group
 Philipp Schindler, Senior Vice President and Chief Business Officer at Google 
 Jochen Zeitz, CEO of Puma
 Mark Korzilius, founder of Vapiano
 Rolf Hansen, Christian Magel and Thomas S. Enge, founders of Simyo GmbH
 Kai-Uwe Ricke, former CEO of Deutsche Telekom AG
 Martin Krebs, CEO of ING-DiBa
 Jan-Henrik Lafrentz, CFO of MAN Truck & Bus AG
 Markus Schrick, CEO of Hyundai Motor Deutschland GmbH

International network
The EBS maintains a global network of 270 partner universities.

Controversies

New EBS students caught attention in September 2010 as they over-consumed alcohol in September 2010 in very close proximity to the university as part of a freshman ritual. The foundation of the EBS Law School should initially be funded by the state Hesse and the city Wiesbaden with 25 million euro. This was especially criticized because the budgets of public universities were cut at the same time. In April 2011 it became known, that the public support was double than initially planned, now accounting for 50 million euro.  At the end of April the Hessian Ministry for Science announced to examine the reports on expenditure of funds and to freeze all aid money. As a result of the examinations the university had to repay 950,000 Euro, which were during the presidency of Christopher Jahn used for other causes than for the startup of the law school. In the parliamentary commission of inquiry of the State of Hesse as to the potential abuse by EBS of subsidies granted for the setting up of the new law faculty former EBS head of financial affairs Klaus-Peter Niesik in 2013 admitted that EBS had manipulated and brightened data in order to get State subsidies leading to the abuse of tax money. Inquiries by state prosecutors because of a potential fraud at the expense of the State of Hesse led to another state prosecutor raid at the premises of leading EBS management staff on April 9, 2014. A total of four offices and the flats of three indicted actual and former EBS management staff members were searched. The two related preliminary proceedings against the accused persons and against EBS University for an administrative offence pursuant to Section 170 (2) of the Code of Criminal Procedure have been discontinued. This means that the public prosecutor's office in Frankfurt has not established sufficient suspicion.

Filmography & books 
 Gestatten: Elite – Auf den Spuren der Mächtigen von morgen. (Engl.: Meet the elite – On the trail of tomorrows powerful) Book, Hoffmann und Campe, Hamburg 2008, 
 "grow or go“. The Architects of the "global village“. Documentary, Germany 2003, 94 Min., Buch: Marc Bauder, Dörte Franke, Regie: Marc Bauder, Produktion: ZDF, Das kleine Fernsehspiel (Four absolvents are followed on their way to become consultants)
 „Von Anfang an Elite“ (Engl.: Elite from the beginning). Documentary, Deutschland 2008, 45 Min., Buch: Julia Friedrichs, Eva Müller, Produktion: WDR, Die Story
 „Die jungen Manager“ (Engl.: The young managers). Documentary about the expectations of the future managers, Germany, 5.06 Min., 25. März 2013

See also
 Ulrich Hommel

References

External links
 
 EBS Alumni Association
 EBS Symposium official website
 EBSpreneurship official website

EBS Business School
Education in Wiesbaden
Educational institutions established in 1971
Rheingau
SRH Holding
Private universities and colleges in Germany